Kheyrabad-e Sofla (also Romanized as Kheyrābād-e Soflá; also known as Khairābād, Kheyrābād, and Kheyrābād-e Pā’īn) is a village in Lishtar Rural District, in the Central District of Gachsaran County, Kohgiluyeh and Boyer-Ahmad Province, Iran. At the 2006 census, its population was 808, in 166 families.

References 

Populated places in Gachsaran County